Derince can refer to:

 Derince
 Derince, Hınıs
 Derince, Hizan
 Derince, Kozluk
 Derince, Sason
 Derince railway station